Delia Ruby Graff Fara (April 28, 1969 – July 18, 2017) was an American philosopher who was professor of philosophy at Princeton University. She specialized in philosophy of language, metaphysics, and philosophical logic.

Early life
Fara's mother was African-American and her father was of Irish and Jewish ancestry. She was raised by her mother as a single parent in New York after her father died when she was a child.

Education and career
A 1991 graduate of Harvard University, Graff Fara earned her PhD at the Massachusetts Institute of Technology in 1997 under the supervision of George Boolos and Robert Stalnaker.  She joined the Princeton faculty the same year as an assistant professor, moving to Cornell University in 2001 and then returning to Princeton as a tenured associate professor in 2005. She died in July 2017.

Philosophical work
Graff Fara is best known for her work on the problem of vagueness, where she defends an interest-relative theory of "contextualism". In her most influential article, "Shifting Sands: An Interest-Relative Theory of Vagueness", she argues that the meanings of vague expressions render the truth conditions of utterances of sentences containing them sensitive to our interests. In her view, as the Stanford Encyclopedia of Philosophy entry on "vagueness" explains, "interest relativity extends to all vague words. For instance, 'child' means a degree of immaturity that is significant to the speaker. Since the interests of the speaker shift, there is an opportunity for a shift in the extension of 'child'."

Selected publications
 "Shifting Sands: An Interest-Relative Theory of Vagueness." Philosophical Topics 28 (2000): 45–81.
 "Descriptions As Predicates." Philosophical Studies 102 (2001): 1-42.
 "Phenomenal Continua and the Sorites." Mind 110 (2001): 905-935.
 The Routledge Companion to Philosophy of Language (co-edited with Gillian Russell). Routledge, 2011.
 "Specifying desires." Nous 47 (2013): 252-272.
 "Names Are Predicates." Philosophical Review 124 (2015): 59-117.

References

External links 
 Fara's Princeton University homepage
 In Memory of Delia Graff Fara (1969 - 2017)
 Princeton University Obituary Professor Delia Graff Fara
 Linguistic Society of America - In Memoriam: Delia Graff Fara
 The New York Times Magazine: The Lives they Lived (2017): Delia Graff Fara

Analytic philosophers
Harvard University alumni
Philosophers of language
Metaphysicians
Princeton University faculty
African-American philosophers
Massachusetts Institute of Technology alumni
Place of birth missing
1969 births
2017 deaths
20th-century African-American people
21st-century African-American people